Elephant Rock Books is an independent  publishing company based in Connecticut.  As of 2013, it is the largest independent publisher in New England.  The press was initially founded by Jotham Burrello in Chicago in 2010.  Burrello decided to start the press while talking with his former teacher, Patricia Ann McNair, about her work; her book, The Temple of the Air, became Elephant Rock's first publication and went on to win positive reviews and several awards.  Elephant Rock also published Briefly Knocked Unconscious By A Low-Flying Duck, an essay anthology of the 2nd Story Collective that has won multiple literary prizes.

In 2014 the press moved into the young adult fiction market with Jessie Ann Foley's novel The Carnival at Bray, which was named a Printz Honor Book.

The publisher is backed by a multimedia company, Elephant Rock Productions, which handles accounting and banking.

References

Book publishing companies based in Connecticut
Publishing companies of the United States